The 5000 metres speed skating event was part of the speed skating at the 1956 Winter Olympics programme. The competition was held on naturally frozen ice on the Lake Misurina. It was held on Sunday, 29 January 1956, started at 11 a.m. and ended at 3 p.m. Forty-six speed skaters from 17 nations competed.

Medalists

Records
These were the standing world and Olympic records (in minutes) prior to the 1956 Winter Olympics.

(*) The record was set in a high altitude venue (more than 1000 metres above sea level) and on naturally frozen ice.

(**) The record was set on naturally frozen ice.

At first Helmut Kuhnert who skated in the first pair set a new Olympic record with 8:04.3 minutes. In the third pair Wim de Graaff bettered the Olympic record with 8:00.2 minutes. Finally Boris Shilkov set a new Olympic record with 7:48.7 minutes on the way to win the fourth heat and the gold medal.

Results

See also

 1956 Winter Olympics

References

External links
Official Olympic Report
 

Speed skating at the 1956 Winter Olympics